The Aberystwyth Times was a weekly newspaper published in Aberystwyth and circulated nationally in Wales, founded by Richard Steele. Most of the paper was in English, with a section in Welsh.

Welsh Newspapers Online has digitised eighty-nine issues of the Aberystwyth Times (1868-1870) from the newspaper holdings of the National Library of Wales.

References

Newspapers published in Wales
Defunct newspapers published in the United Kingdom
Defunct weekly newspapers